Timothy Hugh Stewart Duke, FSA (born 12 June 1953) is an officer of arms at the College of Arms in London.

Career 
Duke is the son of William Falcon Duke and his wife, Mary Cecile, née Jackson. He was educated at Uppingham School and then Fitzwilliam College, Cambridge, graduating with a BA degree and later proceeding to MA. He served as a research assistant at the College from 1981, before he began his career as an officer of arms in 1989 when he was appointed Rouge Dragon Pursuivant of Arms in Ordinary. He held this position until 7 August 1995, when he was appointed Chester Herald of Arms in Ordinary. He was appointed Norroy and Ulster King of Arms on 1 July 2014. On 1 April 2021, he was appointed Clarenceux King of Arms in succession to Patric Dickinson.

He became an Esquire of the Order of St John in 1988, Honorary Secretary of the Harleian Society in 1994, and in 2010, was appointed Honorary Genealogist to the Order of St Michael and St George. In 2018, Duke was elected a Fellow of the Society of Antiquaries of London.

Decorations
  2002: Queen Elizabeth II Golden Jubilee Medal
  2012: Queen Elizabeth II Diamond Jubilee Medal

Arms

See also
Heraldry
Pursuivant
Herald

Notes

External links
The College of Arms
His shield (at the bottom)
The Harleian Society

1953 births
English officers of arms
British genealogists
Living people
Esquires of the Order of St John
Alumni of Fitzwilliam College, Cambridge